The 2019 U Sports Men's Final 8 Basketball Tournament was held March 7–10, 2019 in Halifax, Nova Scotia. It was hosted by Dalhousie University, which has hosted the championship five other times, most recently in 2017. Sports & Entertainment Atlantic (S|E|A) was a production partner for the event, its third year coordinating the championship game. The tournament was held at the Scotiabank Centre for the third consecutive year and it was the 32nd time that the tournament was played in Halifax. The Carleton University Ravens won the tournament, beating defending national champions, the University of Calgary Dinos, 83-49. The win extended Carleton's record number of men's basketball titles to 14.

Participating teams

Championship Bracket

Consolation Bracket

See also 
2019 U Sports Women's Basketball Championship

References 

2018–19 in Canadian basketball
2019 in Nova Scotia
Dalhousie University
U Sports Men's Basketball Championship